Traben-Trarbach is a Verbandsgemeinde ("collective municipality") in the district Bernkastel-Wittlich, in Rhineland-Palatinate, Germany. Its seat of administration is in Traben-Trarbach. On 1 July 2014 it was expanded with the municipalities of the former Verbandsgemeinde Kröv-Bausendorf.

The Verbandsgemeinde Traben-Trarbach consists of the following Ortsgemeinden ("local municipalities"):

 Bausendorf
 Bengel
 Burg 
 Diefenbach
 Enkirch 
 Flußbach
 Hontheim
 Irmenach 
 Kinderbeuern
 Kinheim
 Kröv
 Lötzbeuren 
 Reil
 Starkenburg 
 Traben-Trarbach
 Willwerscheid

Verbandsgemeinde in Rhineland-Palatinate